Epicasta is a genus of longhorn beetles of the subfamily Lamiinae, containing the following species:

 Epicasta ocellata Thomson, 1864
 Epicasta turbida (Pascoe, 1866)

References

Desmiphorini
Cerambycidae genera